Litchfield Municipal Airport  is a public use airport located two nautical miles (3.7 km) southwest of the central business district of Litchfield, in Montgomery County, Illinois, United States. It is owned by the Litchfield Airport Authority.

Facilities and aircraft 
It has two asphalt paved runways: 18/36 is 4,003 by 75 feet (1,220 x 23 m) (PAPI - REIL) and 9/27 is out of service indefinitely; it measures 3,901 by 75 feet (1,189 x 23 m) (VASI - REIL).

For the 12-month period ending August 31, 2008, the airport had 15,000 aircraft operations, an average of 41 per day: 92% general aviation, 4% air taxi, 4% military. At that time there were 38 aircraft based at this airport: 92% single-engine, 5% multi-engine and 3% ultralight.

References

External links 
 Aerial photo as of 29 March 1998 from USGS The National Map
 

Airports in Illinois
Transportation buildings and structures in Montgomery County, Illinois